This is a list of the albums ranked number one in the United States during 2021. The top-performing albums and EPs in the U.S. are ranked on the Billboard 200 chart, which is published by Billboard magazine. The data is compiled by Nielsen SoundScan based on multi-metric consumption as measured in album-equivalent units, which comprise album sales, track sales, and streams on digital music platforms. Each unit equals one album sold, or 10 individual digital tracks sold from an album, or 3,750 ad-supported or 1,250 paid/subscription on-demand official audio and video streams generated by songs from an album.

30, the fourth studio album by English singer-songwriter Adele, was the best-selling album of 2021, with 1.464 million copies sold. It garnered the biggest opening week of 2021 with 839,000 album-equivalent units, and topped the chart for the final four weeks of the year. Dangerous: The Double Album by American country singer Morgan Wallen was the best-performing album of 2021 and the longest running number-one album of the year, having topped the Billboard 200 for 10 consecutive weeks. It became the first country album since The Chase (1992) by American singer Garth Brooks to reign the Billboard 200 for six or more weeks, and the first album since Whitney (1987) by American singer Whitney Houston, to spend its first 10 weeks at the top spot.

American singer-songwriter Taylor Swift charted three number one albums this year—the most for any artist: her 2020 studio album Evermore and 2021 re-recordings Fearless (Taylor's Version) and Red (Taylor's Version); they collectively spent six weeks atop the Billboard 200. Fearless (Taylor's Version) became the first re-recorded album in history to top the chart. American singer-songwriter Olivia Rodrigo's debut studio album, Sour, is the year's second longest reigning number-one album of the Billboard 200 and the longest-reigning by a female artist, with five non-consecutive weeks spent atop the chart.

Chart history

See also 
 List of Billboard Hot 100 number ones of 2021
 List of Billboard Global 200 number ones of 2021
 2021 in American music

References

United States Albums
2021